A snuff tray, also known as a snuff tablet, is a hand-carved tablet or tray that was made for the purpose of inhaling a psychoactive drug (also referred to as being hallucinogenic, entheogenic, or psychedelic, in the form similar to tobacco snuff prepared as a powder using a snuff tube. Snuff trays are best-known from the Tiwanaku culture of the Andes in South America. The principal substance thought to have been inhaled was known as willka (Anadenanthera colubrina), also referred to as cebil, and known as yopó in northern South America and cohoba in the Greater Antilles, where it was also prepared from other species of the genus Anadenanthera.

Most snuff trays are made of wood. Some are made of stone or bone, though there are very few examples of these materials being used. Snuff trays are rectangular or trapezoidal in shape, depending on what style they are and have a shallow cavity running through them. Their shape relates to the region as well as the culture that they originate from. Most snuff trays have been associated with the Tiwanaku (Tiahuanaco) or the Wari (Huari) culture. They may be decorated with intricate. hand-carved designs on one end as well as on the sides. Snuff trays with carvings represent iconographic motifs that are found in Tiwanaku and Wari art.

Style 

Scientists have tried to categorize these trays based on carvings, geographical significance, time periods and stylistic features. Yet, many trays do not fully represent one style or the other because they are "blank" or lacking significant stylistic features to differentiate them from one style or the other. Snuff trays lacking significant stylistic features make up about 90% of the snuff tray collection to date. Due to this there are mainly two styles of snuff trays. One being the Tiwanaku (Tiahuanaco) style which scientists refer to as the Southern Andean Iconographic style or SAIS. The Tiwanaku (SAIS) style is characterized by a trapezoidal shape, incurving sides and sharp top corners. There are very few snuff trays that represent the Tiwanaku (SAIS) style which makes up about 10% of the collection. While the other 90% are from the Wari (Huari) culture which scientists refer to as the San Pedro de Atacama style or SPA. Due to the abundance of non-Tiwanaku style snuff trays some scientists have tried to better categorize Wari (SPA) trays by creating sub-categories. They have separated the collection from the San Pedro de Atacama (SPA) region into two groups. The first group is referred to as the Circumpueño style. The Circumpueño style trays have been identified through anthropomorphic (human) and zoomorphic (animal) figures performing ceremonial acts or rituals. These trays have been dated back to the Late Intermediate period (100A.D.-1450). The second style of snuff tray is referred to by scientists as the San Pedro style. This style of tray is identified through carved human figures that are not decorated. Scientists have dated San Pedro style trays to the Late Formative period (3500-2000 B.C.) the Middle Horizon (A.D. 700-1000) and the Late Intermediate periods (A.D. 1000-1200). Though these categorize have helped scientists condense the 90% of trays lacking significant stylistic features to 50%, scientists are still lacking distinctive evidence to categorize the remaining trays.

Sites of discovery 

Archaeologists encountered snuff trays while excavating underground tombs and sites in the San Pedro de Atacama region as well as the southern central Andes. Snuff trays were found buried with the elites of ancient societies in their tombs along with other valuable items that lower socioeconomic peoples would not have had access to. Along with snuff trays these mummies have been found with inhaling tubes, spatulas, mortars and pestles, and snuff powder containers. In addition, snuff trays have been found in statues or monolith depictions of mythical ancestral elites or ancestral rulers at Tiwanaku Only so-called presentation monoliths (statues holding a Qiru in the one hand and a snuff tray in the other hand) are holding a snuff tray in one of their hands. Those monoliths are found exclusively at Tiwanaku. This evidence points to snuff trays as having a huge significance in the society and culture of the Tiwanaku state because of their existence. Due to this evidence, scientists and archeologists have concluded that snuff trays were a very significant part of society, culture and the socioeconomic class structure of higher up elite individuals.

Usage 
Snuff trays were used to inhale hallucinogenic drugs, mainly willka and yopo.

References 

Drug paraphernalia
Wari culture